Gereg may refer to:

Gereg (Egschiglen album), 2007 album by Mongolian band Egschiglen
The Gereg, 2019 album by Mongolian band the Hu